Remy Dezengremel House is a historic home and farm complex located at Cape Vincent in Jefferson County, New York. The limestone farmhouse was built in the 1850s and has three sections: a -story main block; a side wing and a 1-story ell off the wing. Also on the property are a barn, silo, and shed.

It was listed on the National Register of Historic Places in 1985.

References

Houses completed in 1855
Houses in Jefferson County, New York
Houses on the National Register of Historic Places in New York (state)
National Register of Historic Places in Jefferson County, New York